This is a list of notable African-American singers that gives their year of birth and music genres with which they are associated.

A
 Aaliyah (1979–2001): R&B, pop
 Alicia Keys (born 1981) : pop
 Gregory Abbott (born 1954): soul, R&B, his father was born in Venezuela
 Yolanda Adams (born 1961): Gospel 
 Ivie Anderson (1904–1949): jazz
 Marian Anderson (1897–1993): opera
 Louis Armstrong (1901–1971): jazz
 Martina Arroyo (born 1936): opera
 Belcalis Marlenis Almanzar (born 1992): hip hop
 Jhené Aiko: R&B, neo soul
 Ashanti: R&B, hip hop, soul
 Amerie (born 1980): R&B, pop, hip hop, soul funk, go-go

B
 Erykah Badu (born 1971): neo soul, R&B, funk, hip-hop
 Mildred Bailey (1907–1951): jazz
 Chloe Bailey (born 1998): R&B
 Halle Bailey (born 2000): R&B
 Pearl Bailey (1918–1990): vaudeville
 LaVern Baker (1929–1997): R&B
 Florence Ballard (1943–1976): R&B, pop, soul
 Azealia Banks (born 1991): Hip hop, pop, hip house
 Fantasia Barrino (born 1984): R&B, soul, gospel
 Fontella Bass (1940–2012): R&B, soul 
 Kathleen Battle (born 1948): opera
 Madeline Bell (born 1942): soul
 Denée Benton (born 1992): Broadway, pop
 Brook Benton (born 1931–1988): pop, R&B, soul 
 Chuck Berry (1926–2017): rock
 Andy Bey (born 1939): jazz
 Beyoncé (born 1981): R&B, pop
 Blind Blake (1896–1934): ragtime, blues
 Bobby Bland (1930–2013): blues
 Jules Bledsoe (1897–1943): opera, Broadway
 Mary J. Blige (born 1971): R&B, soul, hip-hop soul
 Lucille Bogan (1887–1948): blues
 Brandy (born 1979): R&B
 Breland (born 1995): country trap
 Dee Dee Bridgewater (born 1950): jazz
 Brian McKnight (born 1969): R&B
 James Brown (1933–2006): soul, funk
 Oscar Brown Jr (1926–2005): jazz
 Peabo Bryson (born 1951): soul, R&B
 Grace Bumbry (born 1937): opera
 Solomon Burke (1940–2010): blues, gospel, R&B, soul, rock and roll
 Chris Brown (born 1989): R&B, hip-hop, soul, pop
 Kandi Burruss (born 1976): R&B, pop, hip hop, soul
 Toni Braxton (born 1967): R&B, soul, pop, dance-pop, hip hop

C
 Cab Calloway (1907–1994): jazz
 Alyson Cambridge (born 1980): operatic soprano and classical music, jazz, and American popular song singer
 Mariah Carey (born 1969): R&B, pop, hip-hop, soul
 Jean Carn (born 1947): jazz, pop
 Betty Carter (1929–1998): jazz
 Playboi Carti (born 1996): Hip hop
 Doja Cat (born 1995): hip-hop, R&B, pop, pop rap
 Gene Chandler (born 1931): R&B, soul, disco
 Tracy Chapman (born 1964): folk
 Ray Charles (1930–2004): R&B, soul, blues, gospel, country, jazz, pop, rock and roll
 Ciara: R&B, hip-hop, pop
 Tasha Cobbs (born 1981): contemporary Christian music, urban contemporary gospel
 Freddy Cole (1931–2020): jazz
 J. Cole (born 1985): hip-hop
 Nat King Cole (1919–1965): jazz, swing, pop
 Natalie Cole (1950–2015): R&B, pop
 Mitty Collier (born 1941): soul, R&B, gospel
 Sam Cooke (1931–1964): soul, gospel, R&B
 Ida Cox (1888 or 1896–1967): blues, jazz
 Randy Crawford (born 1952): jazz, R&B, disco
 Kid Cudi (born 1984): hip-hop, alternative rock
 50 Cent (born 1975): hip-hop
 Keyshia Cole (born 1981): R&B, hip-hop, hip-hop soul
 Tameka Cottle (born 1975): R&B, soul

D
 Sammy Davis Jr. (1925–1990): pop, jazz, easy listening, swing
 Jason Derulo (born 1989): R&B, hip hop, pop
 Bo Diddley (1928–2008): R&B, rock and roll
 Raheem DeVaughn (born 1975): R&B, neo soul
 Fats Domino (1928–2017): Rock and roll, boogie-woogie, New Orleans rhythm and blues
 Shea Diamond (born 1978): Soul, R&B
 Drake (born 1986): Hip hop

E
 Billy Eckstine (1914–1993): jazz, pop
 Betty Everett (1939–2001): soul
 Cassandra Extavour: classical singer
 Faith Evans: R&B, hip hop, soul

F
 Fantasia: R&B
 Ella Fitzgerald (1917–1996): jazz
 Roberta Flack (born 1937): jazz, pop
 Aretha Franklin (1942–2018): soul, gospel
 Erma Franklin (1938–2002): gospel, soul
 Kirk Franklin (born 1970): soul, gospel
 Future: hip-hop
 Jamie Foxx (born 1967): R&B, pop, hip-hop

G
 Marvin Gaye (1939–1984): R&B, soul, funk, jazz, pop
 Gloria Gaynor (born 1943): disco, R&B
 Jamie Grace (born 1991): Christian pop, gospel
 Al Green (born 1946): R&B, soul
 Ginuwine (born 1970): R&B
 Diana Gordon (born 1985): R&B, dance-pop, house
 Kevin Gates (born 1986): Hip hop

H
 Halsey) (born 1994): Pop
H.E.R
 Adelaide Hall (1901–1993): jazz
 Ciara Harris (born 1985): R&B, hip-hop, crunk&B, pop, dance
 Donny Hathaway (1945–1979): soul, jazz, gospel, R&B, blues
 Richie Havens (1941–2013): folk rock, funk, blues, soul
 Isaac Hayes (1942–2008): blues, jazz, soul, funk, disco
 Nicole Heaston: opera
 Jon Hendricks (1921–2017): jazz
 Jimi Hendrix (1942–1970): rock guitarist, singer-songwriter
 Nona Hendryx (born 1944): funk, soul, pop, R&B, rock
 Lauryn Hill (born 1975): R&B, neo soul, hip-hop, folk, reggae
 Z. Z. Hill (1935–1984): blues
 Billie Holiday (1915–1959): soul, blues
 Jennifer Holliday (born 1960): R&B, soul, pop, house, dance, gospel
 Shirley Horn (1934–2005): jazz
 Lena Horne (1917–2010): jazz, pop
 Cissy Houston (born 1933): soul, gospel, disco
 Thelma Houston (born 1946): R&B, soul, disco, Motown, gospel
 Whitney Houston (1963–2012): R&B, pop, soul, gospel
 Jennifer Hudson (born 1981): R&B, soul, pop
 Phyllis Hyman (1949–1995): soul, R&B quiet, jazz, disco
 Keri Hilson (born 1982): R&B
 Adina Howard (born 1973): R&B, hip-hop, soul

I
 James Ingram (1952–2019): R&B, pop, soul
 Luther Ingram (1937–2007): R&B, soul
 Ronald Isley (born 1941): R&B, soul

J
 Ray J: R&B
 Jackson family: pop, R&B, soul, dance
 Rebbie Jackson (born 1950)
 Jackie Jackson (born 1951)
 Tito Jackson (born 1953)
 Jermaine Jackson (born 1954)
 La Toya Jackson (born 1956)
 Marlon Jackson (born 1957)
 Michael Jackson (1958–2009)
 Randy Jackson (born 1961)
 Janet Jackson (born 1966)
 Chuck Jackson (born 1937): R&B
 Freddie Jackson (born 1956): soul
 Mahalia Jackson (1911–1972): gospel
 Millie Jackson (born 1944): soul, disco, R&B
 Randy Jackson (born 1956)
 Etta James (1938–2012): blues, R&B, soul, jazz, gospel
 Al Jarreau (1940–2017): jazz, R&B, soul
 Robert Johnson (1911-1938): blues
 Etta Jones (1928–2001): jazz
 Howard Jones (born 1970): rock
 Valerie June (born 1982): folk, blues, soul, bluegrass, pop
 Jeremih: R&B, hip hop
 Montell Jordan (born 1968): R&B, hip-hop, soul
 Lyfe Jennings (born 1978): R&B, soul
 Joe (born 1973): R&B
 Jacquees (born 1994): R&B

K
 Alicia Keys (born 1981): R&B, soul, pop, hip-hop
 Chaka Khan (born 1953): R&B, pop, soul, disco, jazz, gospel
 Eartha Kitt (1927–2008): cabaret, torch, jazz
Gladys Knight (born 1944): soul, R&B, pop
Ben E King (1938–2015): R&B
Solange Knowles (born 1986): R&B, pop, soul, hip-hop, funk
R. Kelly: R&B
Kelis (born 1979): R&B, pop, hip-hop, soul, electronic
Chief Keef (born 1995): Hip hop, drill

L
 Lloyd Garmadon (from ninjago): dance, rock
 Patti LaBelle (born 1944): R&B, soul, disco, dance, gospel, funk
 Kendrick Lamar (born 1987): hip-hop, rap
 John Larkin (1877–1936): minstrel, vaudeville
 Kenny Lattimore (born 1970): R&B
 Bettye LaVette (born 1946): soul, blues, rock and roll, funk, gospel, country
 Huddie Ledbetter (1888–1949): folk, blues
 Swae Lee (born 1993): hip-hop, R&B
 John Legend (born 1978): pop, R&B, soul
 Coi Leray (born 1997): Hip hop
 Abbey Lincoln (1930–2010): jazz
 Lil Nas X (born 1999): hip-hop, pop, country, trap
 Lizzo (born 1988): R&B, pop
 Frankie Lymon (1942–1968): R&B, doo-wop, pop, swing
 Queen Latifah (born 1970): hip-hop, R&B, soul, jazz, gospel, dance

M
Mario Mario (from mario)
Johnny Mathis (born 1935): pop, jazz
Curtis Mayfield (1942–1999): soul, funk, R&B
China Anne McClain (born 1998): R&B, pop
 Lauryn McClain (born 1997): R&B, pop
 Sierra McClain (born 1994): R&B, pop
 Carmen McRae (1920–1994): jazz
 Nicki Minaj (born 1982): hip-hop, pop
 Wanya Morris (born 1973): R&B, soul
 Janelle Monáe (born 1985): funk, R&B, psychedelic soul, hip-hop
 YNW Melly (born 1999): hip-hop, trap, R&B
 Mýa
 Miguel: R&B
 K. Michelle: R&B, soul
 Teairra Marí: R&B
 Mario (born 1986): R&B
 Monica (born 1980): R&B, soul, hip-hop soul
 Victoria Monét (born 1989): pop, R&B
 Chrisette Michele (born 1982): R&B, hip-hop, soul, jazz

N
 Rico Nasty (born 1997): Hip hop, rock, rap rock
 Meshell Ndegeocello (born 1968): funk, soul, jazz, hip-hop, reggae, rock
 Anthony Nelson (born 1975): gospel
 Aaron Neville (born 1941): R&B, soul, country, gospel, jazz, pop
 Jessye Norman (born 1945): opera
 Brandy Norwood (born 1979): R&B, pop, hip-hop
 Nicki Minaj
 Lil Nas X (born 1999): hip-hop, LGBT hip-hop, pop rap, country rap 
 Ne-Yo
 Nivea (born 1982): R&B, hip-hop
 Noname Gypsy (born 1991): Hip hop

O
 Alexander O'Neal (born 1953): R&B, soul
 Jeffrey Osborne (born 1948): R&B, soul
 Frank Ocean: R&B
 Omarion: R&B
 Offset (born 1991): Hip hop

P
 Billy Porter: (born 1969): R&B, soul
 Pleasure P (born 1984): R&B 
 Paul Pena (1950-2005): Delta blues, jazz, morna, flamenco, folk, rock, Tuvan throat singing
 Teddy Pendergrass (1950–2010): R&B, soul, disco, funk
 Richard Wayne Penniman (Little Richard) (1932–2020): rock & roll, R&B, gospel, soul
 Wilson Pickett (1941–2006): R&B, soul
 Gregory Porter (born 1971): jazz
 Billy Preston (1946–2006): R&B, rock, soul, funk, gospel
 Prince (1958–2016): pop, rock
 Leontyne Price (born 1927): opera
 Charley Pride (1934–2020): country
 Arthur Prysock (1924 or 1929–1997): jazz, R&B, easy listening
 Kelly Price (born 1973): gospel

R
 Ma Rainey (1882 or 1886–1939): blues
 Otis Redding (1941–1967): soul, R&B, blues
 Della Reese (1931–2017): jazz, gospel, pop
 Dianne Reeves (born 1956): jazz
 Martha Reeves (born 1941): R&B, pop
 Lionel Richie (born 1949): soul, R&B, pop, country, gospel
 Flo Rida (born 1979): hip-hop, hip house, pop rap 
 Minnie Riperton (1947–1979): soul, R&B, jazz, disco
 Paul Robeson (1898–1976): Americana, pop, spirituals, classical, folk
 Bill "Bojangles" Robinson (1878–1949): minstrel, vaudeville, jazz, pop
 Smokey Robinson (born 1940): R&B, soul, pop
 Diana Ross (born 1944): R&B, soul, disco, jazz, pop, dance
 Kelly Rowland (born 1981): R&B, pop, hip-hop, soul, dance
 Patrice Rushen (born 1954): R&B
 Trippie Redd: hip-hop
 RuPaul (born 1960): Dance, pop

S
 Jill Scott (born 1972): R&B, soul, neo soul, hip-hop, spoken word, jazz
 Jimmy Scott (1925–2014): jazz
 Peggy Scott-Adams (born 1948): blues, R&B
 Travis Scott (born 1991): hip-hop
 Marlena Shaw (born 1942): jazz, blues and soul
 Nina Simone (1933–2003): jazz, blues, folk, R&B, gospel, pop
 Jordin Sparks (born 1989): R&B, pop
 Bessie Smith (1894–1937): blues
 O. C. Smith (1932–2001): R&B, jazz, soul
 Elias Soriano (born 1975): rock
 Mavis Staples (born 1939): soul, gospel, R&B
 Edwin Starr (1942–2003): soul, R&B, funk, disco
 Candi Staton (born 1940): soul, R&B, gospel, dance, disco
 Dakota Staton (1930–2007): jazz
 Angie Stone (born 1961): R&B, soul
 Sly Stone (born 1943): funk, R&B
 Jazmine Sullivan: R&B
 Maxine Sullivan (1911–1987): jazz
 Donna Summer (1948–2012): disco, rock, dance, R&B
 Sisqó (born 1978): R&B, hip-hop soul, pop
 Raven-Symoné: R&B, hip-hop
 SZA: R&B
 Keith Sweat (born 1961): R&B, new jack swing, hip-hop, soul, urban
 Sylvester (1947-1988): Disco

T
 T-Pain: R&B, hip-hop, pop rap
 Tammi Terrell (1945–1970): R&B, soul, pop
 Joe Tex (1935–1982): R&B, soul, funk, disco
 Rufus Thomas (1917–2001): R&B, funk, soul, blues
 Ike Turner (1931–2007): R&B, blues, rock and roll, funk
 Tina Turner (born 1939): R&B, pop, soul, dance, rock and roll
 The-Dream: R&B
 Tinashe: R&B, pop
 Young Thug: hip-hop
 Tyrese Gibson (born 1978): R&B
 Tweet (born 1971): R&B
 Tyga (born 1989): hip-hop
 Teyana Taylor (born 1990): R&B, hip-hop, pop
 Terry Blade: Singer-Songwriter

U
 Usher: R&B, pop

V
 Bobby V (born 1980): R&B
 Luther Vandross (1951–2005): soul
 Sarah Vaughan (1924–1990): jazz
 Tommy Vext (born 1982): rock
 Brooke Valentine (born 1984): R&B, pop, hip-hop, crunk
 Vedo – Rhythm and blues singer

W
 Fats Waller (1904–1943): jazz, pop
 Wanya Morris: R&B
 William Warfield (1920–2002): opera, pop
 Dionne Warwick (born 1940): gospel, R&B, soul, pop
 Dinah Washington (1924–1963): jazz, blues, R&B, gospel, traditional pop
 Gino Washington (born 1946?): R&B, rock
 Ethel Waters (1896–1977): blues, jazz, Broadway, big band, pop
 Lil Wayne (born 1982): hip-hop
 Mary Wells (1943–1992) R&B, pop, soul, rock
 Kanye West (born 1977): hip-hop, pop, R&B, Christian hip-hop, gospel
 Barry White (1944–2003): soul, R&B, pop
 will.i.am (born 1975): hip-hop, pop, R&B
 Bert Williams (1874–1922): Broadway, vaudeville, minstrel
 Joe Williams (1918–1999): jazz
 Lenny Williams (born 1945): soul, R&B, jazz
 Marion Williams (1927–1994): gospel 
 Pharrell Williams (born 1973): hip-hop, R&B, funk, pop
 Nancy Wilson (1937–2018): jazz
 CeCe Winans (born 1964): gospel
 Mario Winans (born 1974): R&B
 Lawrence Winters(né Lawrence Lafayette Whisonant) (1915–1965): opera, concert
 Bill Withers (1938–2020): soul, R&B, smooth soul, blues, funk
 Lajon Witherspoon (born 1972): rock
 Juice Wrld (1998–2019): SoundCloud rap, emo rap, alternative rock, pop
 Howlin' Wolf (1910–1976): blues
 Stevie Wonder (born 1950): soul, pop
 Bobby Womack (1944–2014): soul, R&B
 Brenton Wood (born 1941): soul, R&B, pop
 Betty Wright (1953–2020): soul, R&B
 Lizz Wright (born 1980): jazz, gospel
 O. V. Wright (1939–1980): blues

References

 
Lists of African-American people
Lists of singers